Isabella Eklöf (born 10 February 1978) is a Swedish screenwriter and film director.

Eklöf attended the National Film School of Denmark. She served on the crew as a "runner" for the 2008 Swedish film Let the Right One In.

Eklöf co-wrote the 2018 Swedish film Border with director Ali Abbasi; together they expanded on the source material, a short story by John Ajvide Lindqvist. For Border, Eklöf, Abbasi and Lindqvist were nominated for the Guldbagge Award for Best Screenplay; they were also nominated for the European Film Award for Best Screenwriter.  She also wrote and directed the 2018 Danish film Holiday, for which she won the New Wave Best Picture and New Wave Best Director awards at the Fantastic Fest in Austin, Texas; Holiday went on to win four Bodil Awards, including Best Danish Film.

Awards and nominations

References

External link

1978 births
Living people
Swedish screenwriters
Swedish film directors
Swedish women film directors
Swedish women screenwriters